Couch Potatoes is an American game show which featured two teams competing in a television-centric quiz game. The program premiered in syndication on January 23, 1989. It aired in first-run until June 9, 1989, for a total of one hundred episodes, and reruns aired after that until September 8, 1989.

Couch Potatoes was hosted by Marc Summers, who at the time was also hosting the children's game show Double Dare on both Nickelodeon and local stations. Comedian and voice actor Joe Alaskey was also featured on the show, serving as its announcer and also playing an on-camera role as Summers' next door neighbor. After Alaskey left the series toward the end of its run, his character was retired and Jim McKrell took over his announcer role (albeit off camera).

Couch Potatoes was taped at Hollywood Center Studios and was a production of Saban Entertainment with Westinghouse Broadcasting's Group W Productions as distributor. The series was created by Ellen Levy and the show's producer-writer David M. Greenfield.

Gameplay
Couch Potatoes featured two teams of three players each, with one of the teams usually a returning champion. To tie in with the overall theme of the show, both teams were given some sort of TV-centric name.

The game started with a toss-up question, referred to as the "Tune-In" question, a multiple choice question worth 25 points and control. All six players had the ability to ring in and answer, but answering incorrectly forfeited control to the other team.

The team in control was then asked three questions referred to as "Spin-Offs". Each question was worth 25 points (referred to as "ratings points") and each member of the team could only attempt one question. If at any time the team answered incorrectly, the other team was given a chance to steal control.

Four rounds were played in this manner, and for the third and fourth the point values doubled to 50 for each correct answer.

Late in the run, two additional rounds of questioning were added; the first three rounds were worth 25 points and the last three 50.

Couch Up Round
The Couch Up Round was the last round and was played face-off style.

Each question was a toss up, and the value for each question was determined by a randomizer. After the question was asked, whichever team member that buzzed in first was told the value of the question and prompted for an answer. Answering correctly awarded the points, but answering incorrectly gave the opponent a chance to steal.

The question values ranged from 50 to 200 points in increments of 50. The randomizer could also display "Couch Up", which meant that if the trailing team answered the question correctly they would immediately tie the score. If the leaders answered correctly the team did not gain or lose anything.

Six questions were asked, and play moved in order from one end of the couch to the other.

At the end of the six questions, the team in the lead won the game, $1,000, and a chance for $5,000 more in the Channel Roulette bonus round. The opponents received consolation prizes.

If there was a tie at the end of the Couch Up Round, one final question was played and whoever answered it correctly won the game for his/her team.

Channel Roulette
In Channel Roulette, the objective for the team was to identify TV shows using pictures of their casts. There were twelve "channels", laid out in a 4-by-3 grid and numbered 2-13 as on a standard VHF setup, and eleven of them featured pictures. Each of those pictures had a value attached, with amounts ranging from 100 to 1,000 points; the higher the value, the more obscure the picture.

One at a time, moving end to end as before, each team member would choose a channel. If a picture was hidden behind the channel Summers would inform the team of its value before the player guessed.

One of the channels hid a screen called "Pay TV". If this came up at any time the team's score reset to zero, but play would continue as long as there was time left.

The team had thirty seconds to accumulate at least 1,000 points; doing so won $5,000. If they did not do so, they received $1 for each point accumulated.

Teams stayed on the show until they won five matches or were defeated.

Episode status
All episodes of Couch Potatoes exist. Reruns began airing on USA Network on September 11, 1989, three days after the show aired for the final time in syndication, and continued to air until March 23, 1990.

Guests
During its eight-month run, Couch Potatoes had numerous celebrity guests on the show; they usually appeared in Round Four asking questions about their career or show. One show featured Jack Larson and Noel Neill, better known as Jimmy Olsen and Lois Lane from the 1950s series The Adventures of Superman, asking questions about the series. Another notable guest was Gary Coleman, who asked questions about Diff'rent Strokes and mentioned to host Summers he was asked to be the youth chairman for the Just Say No Foundation. During one week, game show celebrities Bob Eubanks, Jim Lange, Janice Pennington, Wink Martindale, Peter Marshall, Johnny Gilbert, and Gary Owens appeared.

Other celebs included Cubby O'Brien from The Mickey Mouse Club, Jay North from Dennis the Menace, Larry Mathews from The Dick Van Dyke Show, Isabel Sanford from The Jeffersons, Dick Sargent from Bewitched, Alaina Reed Hall from 227, Dorothy Lyman from Mama's Family, Steve Allen, and Rebeca Arthur from Perfect Strangers. The premiere episode had Dennis Franz as a guest asking questions about Hill Street Blues.

See also
Remote Control (game show)
Telly Addicts
Test Pattern (game show)

References

External link
Couch Potatoes on IMDb

Television series about television
First-run syndicated television programs in the United States
1980s American game shows
1989 American television series debuts
1989 American television series endings
Television series by Saban Entertainment
Westinghouse Broadcasting